The Empty Mirror is an experimental dramatic feature-length film using historical images and speculative fiction to study the life and mind of Adolf Hitler. The film is a psychological journey that examines the nature of evil and the dark strands of human nature. The 1996 film was premiered at the Cannes International Film Festival and was released theatrically by Lions Gate Films. The film had its cable premiere on HBO.

Plot
The film is a fantastical journey through the looking-glass of history into the darkest recesses of the mind of Adolf Hitler. In a dreamlike subterranean environment removed from historical time, Adolf Hitler (Norman Rodway) confronts the demons of his own psyche. As he dictates his memoirs, Hitler encounters apparitions of his confidant, Joseph Goebbels (Joel Grey), his enigmatic mistress, Eva Braun (Camilla Soeberg), Hermann Göring (Glenn Shadix), Sigmund Freud (Peter Michael Goetz) and the mysterious Woman in Black (Hope Allen).

Through haunting images, Hitler's stream-of-consciousness soliloquies and exchanges with his phantom guests, The Empty Mirror presents a frightening primer on genius and psychosis, domination and destruction. The action unfolds amidst a streaming flow of archival film footage intercut with images from Leni Riefenstahl's masterpiece of Nazi propaganda, Triumph of the Will, as well as private home movies shot by Eva Braun.

Cast
Norman Rodway as Adolf Hitler
Joel Grey as Joseph Goebbels
Camilla Søeberg as Eva Braun
Peter Michael Goetz as Sigmund Freud
Doug McKeon as The Typist
Glenn Shadix as Hermann Göring
Hope Allen as Woman in Black
Lori Scott as Floating Female Spirit
Raul Kobrinsky as Jailer
Sarah Benoit as White Nurse
John Paul Jones as Extremely Large Man
Alan Richards as Odd-Looking Man
Adolf Hitler as Himself (archive footage)
Heinrich Himmler as Himself (archive footage)
Joseph Stalin as Himself (archive footage)

Reception
Critical reaction to the film was generally favorable. Ella Taylor of The Atlantic Monthly called it an "ambitious, fascinating feature debut". David Sterritt of The Christian Science Monitor said "it conjures up a postmodern version of what composer Richard Wagner called a Gesamtkunstwerk, or 'total art work'". Ed Kelleher of Film Journal International called it "[a] vivid, unsettling… bold, demanding film…". Also impressed, The Boston Phoenix reported, "in its silent moments of visual horror, many of them enduringly haunting, The Empty Mirror transcends its ambitious erudition, becoming a work of beauty and emotional depth". On Norman Rodway as Hitler, Joe Leydon of MSNBC said, "Rodway – whose performance as Hitler is a canny balance of prideful fanaticism and anxious rationalization – is truly mesmerizing." Similarly, Peter Stack of The San Francisco Chronicle remarked, "Rodway's bellowing, sometimes pleading tour-de-force is so extraordinary that it's almost scary to watch." On a negative front, Lawrence Van Gelder of The New York Times, commented, "Adolf Hitler may have been many things, but it seems unlikely that he was the colossal bore portrayed in the hyperthyroid hodgepodge of pseudo-psychotherapy." Left unimpressed, Kevin Thomas of The Los Angeles Times mused, "There's lots of flashy visuals as punctuation, but they simply serve to underline the theatricality of this entire endeavor, which belongs on a stage, if anywhere at all."

Awards
Best Narrative Film – New England Film Festival (1997)
Gold Award – Charleston Worldfest (1996)
Critics' Choice – Los Angeles AFI International Film Festival (1996)
Best Cinematography – Fantasporto Film Festival (1997)
Best Cinematography – Houston International Film Festival (1997)
Best First Feature – Houston International Film Festival (1997)
Lumieres Award – New Orleans International Film Festival (1997)
Medal of the President of the Republic of Italy – Salerno International Film Festival
Best Feature Film – Sinking Creek Film Festival (1997)

See also
List of Holocaust films

References

External links
The Empty Mirror official website
The Empty Mirror at The Internet Movie Database
The Empty Mirror at Rotten Tomatoes

Cultural depictions of Adolf Hitler
Cultural depictions of Hermann Göring
Cultural depictions of Joseph Goebbels
Cultural depictions of Sigmund Freud
1996 drama films
1996 films
American independent films
Lionsgate films
Films scored by John Frizzell (composer)
1990s English-language films
1990s American films